A deputy lieutenant of Aberdeenshire is commissioned by the Lord Lieutenant of Aberdeenshire.

The Lieutenancy Area of Aberdeenshire was previously known as the County of Aberdeen – not to be confused with the former County of the City of Aberdeen.

Deputy lieutenants support the work of the lord-lieutenant. There can be several deputy lieutenants at any time, depending on the population of the county. Their appointment does not terminate with the changing of the lord-lieutenant, but they usually retire at age 75.

19th century
30 June 1849: The Right Honourable Francis Alexander Keith Falconer, Earl of Kintore
30 June 1849: Alexander Bannerman
30 June 1849: James Gordon
27 May 1861: The Honourable Arthur Hamilton Gordon
27 May 1861: Colonel Charles Leslie
27 May 1861: Mountstuart Elphinstone Grant Duff
27 May 1861: Sir James Horn Burnett of Leys
27 May 1861: Francis Farquharson
27 May 1861: James Dyce Nicol
27 May 1861: Arthur Forbes Gordon
27 May 1861: Lieutenant-Colonel Henry Knight Erskine of Pittodrie
27 May 1861: The Lord Lindsay
27 May 1861: John Gordon
22 September 1862: Thomas James
30 September 1864: His Grace the Duke of Richmond 
30 September 1864: The Earl of Aberdeen
30 September 1864: Lord Saltoun
30 September 1864: Major the Honourable Charles Keith Falconer
30 September 1864: Sir Archibald Grant
30 September 1864: Sir William Forbes
30 September 1864: Colonel James Ross Farquharson
30 September 1864: John Ramsay
30 September 1864: James Forbes Leith
30 September 1864: John Gordon
26 April 1866: Sir William Coote Seton
26 April 1866: Henry Lumsden
26 April 1866: William Dingwall Fordyce
26 April 1866: John Paton Watson
26 April 1866: Charles John Forbes
26 April 1866: John Elphinstone Dalrymple
26 April 1866: Charles Leslie
26 April 1866: Frederick Fraser
7 December 1869: The Marquis of Huntly
7 December 1869: The Lord Forbes
7 December 1869: Lieutenant-Colonel Ferguson
7 December 1869: B. C. Urquhart
7 December 1869: A. Forbes Irvine
7 December 1869: Colonel Forbes Leslie
7 December 1869: Carlos Pedro Gordon
7 December 1869: Robert O. Farquharson
7 December 1869: James Wilkinson Gordon
7 June 1876: Sir Robert John Abercromby
7 June 1876: William Leslie
7 June 1876: James George Ferguson Russell
7 June 1876: Henry Gordon
7 June 1876: Andrew Robertson
8 June 1876: Alexander Morison Gordon
21 November 1877: The Honourable Alexander Fraser, Master of Saltoun
21 November 1877: Robert Farquharson
21 November 1877: Ainslie Douglas Ainslie
21 November 1877: Robert Grant
21 November 1877: William Ferguson
23 October 1878: Admiral Arthur Farquhar
31 December 1889: Captain Harry Vesey Brooke
31 December 1889: William Alexander Brown
31 December 1889: Harry Gordon Fellowes-Gordon
31 December 1889: The Honourable Atholl Monson Forbes
31 December 1889: Sir Charles Stewart Forbes
31 December 1889: Arthur John Lewis Gordon
31 December 1889: Sir Arthur Henry Grant
31 December 1889: Francis Robert Gregson
31 December 1889: George Hamilton
31 December 1889: Lieutenant-Colonel Alexander Chambers Hunter
31 December 1889: Lieutenant-Colonel William Ross King
31 December 1889: Major Thomas Leith
31 December 1889: Hugh Gordon Lumsden
31 December 1889: Lieutenant-General Sir Peter Stark Lumsden
31 December 1889: Colonel Frank Shirley Russell
20 December 1900: James Ferguson, Esq.
20 December 1900: Hugh Mackay Gordon, Esq.
20 December 1900: The Lord Haddo (he later became Lord Lieutenant of Aberdeenshire)
20 December 1900: Walter Lumsden

20th century
30 January 1908: Baron Sempill
30 January 1908: Joseph Farquharson
11 December 1909: Colonel George Milne
11 December 1909: Colonel James Ogston
11 August 1921: Lieutenant-Colonel Alexander Haldane Farquharson
30 November 1925: Major The Right Honourable Atholl Laurence Cunynghame, Baron Forbes
30 November 1925: Lieutenant-Colonel Garden Beauchamp Duff, 
18 October 1927: The Right Honourable Thomas Coats, Baron Glentanar
18 October 1927: Lieutenant-Colonel Alexander James King, 
14 November 1930: Lieutenant General Sir John T. Burnett-Stuart, 
14 November 1930: Brigadier General John George Harry Hamilton, 
16 January 1932: Falconer Lewis Wallace
6 July 1933: Lieutenant-Colonel James William Ferguson
20 February 1936: Major Alexander Arthur Fraser, Baron Saltoun, 
4 October 1937: Colonel Sir Victor Audley Falconer Mackenzie, 
2 June 1938: Honorary Colonel Robert Bruce, 
25 November 1938: Captain (Brevet Major) Sir Alan McLean, 
1 April 1939: Major Alexander Robert Leith, 
26 June 1941: Colonel Robert James Burton Yates, 
26 February 1945: Captain John Steele Allan
26 February 1945: Colonel Sir Charles Malcolm Barclay-Harvey, 
26 February 1945: Major Arthur Brooke
26 February 1945: Major John Beauchamp Gordon Duff, 
26 February 1945: Admiral Sir Charles Gordon Ramsey, 
18 March 1949: Rear-Admiral Henry Dalrymple Bridges, 
18 March 1949: Major David George Ian Alexander Gordon, 
18 March 1949: Frederick Martin, 
18 March 1949: Sir George Arthur Drostan Ogilvie-Forbes, 
18 March 1949: Lieutenant-Colonel Charles Henry Turner
7 March 1950: Lieutenant-Colonel William Lilburn
16 June 1953: Colonel Sir John Stewart Forbes, 
9 April 1954: Captain (Honorary Major) Harold James Milne, Provost of Fraserburgh 1950-56.
14 January 1961: Major (Honorary Colonel) George William Bruce, 
14 January 1961: Colonel David Peter Davidson, 
14 January 1961: Observer Lieutenant Henry Quentin Forbes Irvine
20 November 1963: Brigadier The Right Honourable James Roderick, The Earl of Caithness, 
20 November 1963: Lieutenant-Colonel Patrick Walter Forbes of Corse, 
20 November 1963: Captain Robin Fogg Elliot
30 December 1966: Colonel Roger John Gary Fleming, 
30 December 1966: Lieutenant-Colonel and Brevet Colonel (Honorary Colonel) Frank Weaver Jack, 
30 December 1966: Major Francis Charles Quentin Irvine of Barra and Straloch, 
30 December 1966: Captain (Honorary Major) James Malcolm Hay
30 December 1966: Honorary Captain Colin Andrew Farquharson
30 August 1971: June Gordon, The Countess of Haddo, 
30 August 1971: Captain Alexander Arthur Alfonso David Maule Ramsay of Mar
6 September 1973: Major Laurence Ronald Kington Fyffe, 
6 September 1973: Major James Scott Gray Munro, 
6 September 1973: Maitland Mackie, 
26 October 1984: Mrs Marion Patricia Campbell
26 October 1984: Marc Floyd Ellington
26 October 1984: Angus Durie Miller Farquharson
19 August 1988: Mrs. Patricia Mary Godsman
19 August 1988: William James Ferguson
19 August 1988: Captain (Honorary Major) Simon Mark Arthur, Baron Glenarthur
12 September 1989: James Malcolm Marcus Humphrey of Dinnet
12 September 1989: Colonel Rodney Francis Maurice Windsor
11 July 1996: Mrs Nicola Barbara Bradford
11 July 1996: John Alexander Campbell Don
11 July 1996: The Hon. Malcolm Nigel Forbes, Master of Forbes
11 July 1996: Mrs Bridget Rosemary Zilla Tuck
18 February 1998: The Right Honourable Alexander George Gordon, Earl of Haddo

21st century
23 May 2001: Mrs Clare Judith Thorogood
23 May 2001: Mr Richard Laurence Oliphant Fyffe
23 May 2001: Mr David Romer Paton, 
22 May 2003: The Most Honourable Joanna Clodagh Gordon, Marchioness of Aberdeen, 
20 April 2005: Dr Maitland Mackie, 
20 April 2005: The Honourable Mrs Katharine Ingrid Mary Isabel Nicolson
20 April 2005: Major Michael Pilgrim Taitt, 
3 May 2013: Mr John Douglas Fowlie
3 May 2013: Mrs Fiona Kennedy
3 May 2013: Mrs Miranda Jane McHardy
3 May 2013: The Reverend Kenneth Ian Mackenzie
3 May 2013: Mr Alexander Philip Manson
3 May 2013: Mr Andrew Cameron Salvesen
20 August 2018: Mrs Jean Catherine Miller Haslam
20 August 2018: Rear Admiral Christopher John Hockley CBE
20 August 2018: Major Grenville Archer Irvine-Fortescue
20 August 2018: Miss Sarah Barbara Mackie
20 August 2018: Mr Steven Alexander Mackison

References

Deputy Lieutenants of Aberdeenshire
Aberdeenshire
Deputy Lieutenants in Scotland